Rags Ragland (born John Lee Morgan Beauregard Ragland, August 23, 1905 – August 20, 1946) was an American comedian and character actor.

Personal life
Ragland was born on August 23, 1905, in Louisville, Kentucky, to parents Adam Joseph Ragland and Stella Petty.

As a youth, he worked as a truck driver, boxer, and movie projectionist in Kentucky.  He was briefly married to Sabina Elizabeth Vanover and they had one child, a son named John Griffin Ragland (1925-1990), before they divorced in 1926. The following year, at the age of 22, Ragland moved to Los Angeles.

Career

Ragland made his show business reputation in burlesque. He quickly became known for his wild ad-libs, unpredictable intrusions into other comics' acts, and a "healthy off-stage libido". Eventually he worked his way up to "top banana" at Minsky's, the dominant burlesque house.

Minsky striptease star Georgia Sothern remembered him fondly in her 1971 memoir, saying she considered Ragland a close friend and the funniest comedian the Minskys had ever produced. His longtime performing partner Phil Silvers referred to Ragland in his autobiography as "my favorite comic".

After burlesque in its classic style died, Ragland made his way to Broadway theatre and films. He usually played good-natured oafs with a knack for fracturing the English language. He became a Metro-Goldwyn-Mayer (MGM) contract player beginning with 1942's Panama Hattie, reprising a role he played on Broadway. Ragland appeared in around two dozen MGM light comedies and musicals. He gained popularity as Red Skelton's cohort in the "Whistling" movies (Whistling in the Dark, Whistling in Dixie, and Whistling in Brooklyn). His final film appearance was in the drama  The Hoodlum Saint (1946).

Death
After returning from an alcoholic bender with Orson Welles in Mexico in 1946, Ragland was scheduled to revive his New York nightclub act with friend Phil Silvers at the Copacabana. He began experiencing pain in his abdomen and was hospitalized. Good friend Frank Sinatra called in a specialist, but the doctors determined that Ragland's liver and kidneys had been destroyed by years of alcohol abuse. After falling into a coma, he died three days before his 41st birthday of uremia. Silvers and Sinatra were by his bedside. Many Hollywood celebrities attended Ragland's funeral – Sinatra sang at the service and Silvers delivered the eulogy.

In a gesture of friendship and respect, Sinatra left the set of his movie It Happened in Brooklyn, flew to New York, and unexpectedly showed up to take Ragland's spot with Silvers at the Copacabana debut (Silvers had decided to continue because he had signed a contract, stating "the show must go on"). Sinatra and Silvers did the routines they had performed during their USO tours. The performance rocked the house. As it came to a close, Silvers cried and said, "May I take a bow for Rags." While crying in remembrance of Ragland, the audience was silent.

Complete filmography

 A Midsummer Night's Dream (1935) as Acting Troupe Member (uncredited)
 Hats and Dogs (1938, Short)
 Ringside Maisie (1941) as Vic
 Whistling in the Dark (1941) as Sylvester Conway
 Born to Sing (1942) as Grunt
 Sunday Punch (1942) as "Killer" Connolly
 Maisie Gets Her Man (1942) as Ears Cofflin
 Somewhere I'll Find You (1942) as Charlie, the Masseur (uncredited)
 The War Against Mrs. Hadley (1942) as Louie
 Panama Hattie (1942) as "Rags"
 Whistling in Dixie (1942) as Sylvester 'Lester' Conway
 Du Barry Was a Lady (1943) as Charlie
 Girl Crazy (1943) as 'Rags'
 Whistling in Brooklyn (1943) as Chester Conway
 3 Men in White (1944) as Hobart Genet
 Meet the People (1944) as Mr. Smith
 The Canterville Ghost (1944) as Big Harry
 Anchors Aweigh (1945) as Police Sergeant
 Her Highness and the Bellboy (1945) as Albert Weever
 Bud Abbott and Lou Costello in Hollywood (1945) as Himself
 The Hoodlum Saint (1946) as Fishface (final film role)

References

External links

1905 births
1946 deaths
Male actors from Louisville, Kentucky
Metro-Goldwyn-Mayer contract players
20th-century American male actors
Alcohol-related deaths in California
American male comedians
American male film actors
American male stage actors
American burlesque performers
Burials in Kentucky
Deaths from kidney disease
20th-century American comedians